The  is a river that flows from Nagano Prefecture's Mount Ōkawairi, through Gifu Prefecture, and enters Mikawa Bay from Aichi Prefecture in Japan. It is designated an A class river by the Ministry of Land, Infrastructure, Transport and Tourism (MLIT).

Geography
After flowing south from Mount Ōkawairi, the river enters Gifu Prefecture and forms the prefectural border with Aichi Prefecture between the cities of Ena and Toyota. Downstream, the Yahagifuru River (矢作古川 Yahagifuru-kawa) follows the original path of the river; however, the river was changed to its current path at the beginning of the Edo period because of flooding. The river forms the border between the cities of Nishio and Hekinan when it flows into Mikawa Bay.

River Communities
Nagano Prefecture
Neba, Hiraya (Shimoina District)
Gifu Prefecture
Ena
Aichi Prefecture
Toyota, Okazaki, Anjō, Nishio, Hekinan

See also

References

External links
 (mouth)

Rivers of Gifu Prefecture
Rivers of Aichi Prefecture
Rivers of Nagano Prefecture
Rivers of Japan